The Columbia Journal of Tax Law is a law journal covering tax law and policy. It publishes three issues each year featuring scholarly articles, shorter works on current policy topics, and student notes. The journal was established in 2010 and is edited by students at Columbia Law School. The current editor-in-chief is Ahmed Farooq.

Tax Matters
Each issue of the journal includes "Tax Matters", a series of op-eds by tax practitioners in response to a current topic in tax law. The topic is chosen by a tax academic.

Student board
The journal is run by a student board. The board is separated into two parts - an executive board and an editorial board. The executive board manages the operations of the journal, selects the articles and oversees the article editing process. The editorial board manages the editorial process, conducts the business of the journal, and manages its website.

Roberts & Holland Prize
The journal awards an annual cash prize to the author of the best student note. The award is sponsored by the law firm of Roberts & Holland LLP. The winner is selected by a vote of the journal board.

Past editors-in-chief
The following persons have been editors-in-chief:
Suyash Paliwal (2009-2010)
Yan Shurin (2010-2011)
Tamar Lusztig (2011-2012)
Arjun Sivakumar (2012-2013)
Meir Lax (2013-2014)

References

External links

American law journals
Columbia University academic journals
Law journals edited by students
Publications established in 2010
Biannual journals
Tax law journals